Antoinette Hertsenberg (born 28 December 1964) is a Dutch television presenter. She is known for presenting the Dutch consumer television shows Radar and Opgelicht?!, the latter for over sixteen years.

Career 

She also presents the television show Dokters van Morgen on the topic of innovations in health care. She also presented the show Medische Detectives, in which people with an undiagnosed condition can tell their story and describe their symptoms in the hope that a viewer may know something that can help with diagnosis.

She was the procession reporter in the 2012 edition of The Passion, a Dutch Passion Play held every Maundy Thursday since 2011.

In May 2022, she won the Media Oeuvre Award.

Childhood
Antoinette Hertsenberg was raised in the Roman Catholic Church, and at 16, she stopped attending.

Personal life 

Hertsenberg is married to Dutch politician and animal rights activist Niko Koffeman. She is a member of the Seventh-day Adventist Church and has three children with her husband.

References

External links 
 

1964 births
Living people
Converts to Adventism
Converts to Protestantism from Roman Catholicism
Dutch television presenters
Dutch women television presenters
Dutch Seventh-day Adventists
Mass media people from The Hague